Pinguicula balcanica, also known as the Balkanian butterwort, is a perennial carnivorous plant in the family Lentibulariaceae.

Distribution
The plant is endemic to the Balkans. It is found in Albania, Bulgaria, Greece, North Macedonia, Serbia and the North of Montenegro (Sandžak region).

It, like most carnivorous plants, grows in wet, nutrient poor, acidic environments and can often be found in high altitude sphagnum bogs, near streams, and wet rocky places in mountains.

Description
It flowers in spring, from May to August, and produces seed from July to September. It survives winter in a hibernaculum.

See also

References 

Carnivorous plants of Europe
balcanica
Flora of Albania
Flora of Bulgaria
Flora of Greece
Flora of North Macedonia
Flora of Serbia
Plants described in 1962